Pease 1 is a planetary nebula located within the globular cluster M15 33,600 light years away in the constellation Pegasus. It was the first planetary nebula known to exist within a globular cluster when it was discovered in 1928 (for Francis G. Pease), and just four more have been found (in other clusters) since. At magnitude 15.5, it requires telescopes with an aperture of at least  to be detected.

References

External links
 Pease 1: Planetary Nebula in Messier 15, SEDS Messier pages

Planetary nebulae
Pegasus (constellation)